The 59th annual Venice International Film Festival was held between 29 August to 8 September 2002. The Golden Lion was awarded to The Magdalene Sisters directed by Peter Mullan.

Jury
The following people comprised the 2002 jury:
 Li Gong (China) (head of jury)
 Jacques Audiard (France)
 Yevgeny Yevtushenko (Russia)
 Ulrich Felsberg (Germany)
 László Kovács (Hungary)
 Francesca Neri (Italy)
 Yeşim Ustaoğlu (Turkey)

Official selection

In competition
The following films were nominated to compete for the Golden Lion of the 59th edition of the festival:

Highlighted title indicates the Golden Lion winner.

Out of competition
The following films were screened as Out of Competition:

Autonomous sections

Venice International Film Critics' Week
The following feature films were selected to be screened as In Competition for this section:
 Two Friends (Due Amici)  by Spiro Scimone, Francesco Sframeli (Italy)
 The Exam (Emtehan) by Nasser Refaie (Iran)
 Woman of Water (Mizu no onna) by Hidenori Sugimori (Japan)
 Mon Huan Bu Luo / Somewhere Over the Dreamland (Meng huan bu luo) by Cheng Wen-tang (Taiwan)
 Roger Dodger by Dylan Kidd (United States)
 Step by Step (Un honnête commerçant) by Philippe Blasband (France)
 The Kite (Zmej) by Aleksej Muradov (Russia)

Awards
 Golden Lion:
 The Magdalene Sisters (Peter Mullan)
Grand Special Jury Prize:
Dom durakov (Andrei Konchalovsky)
Silver Lion for Best Direction:
Oasis (Lee Chang-dong)
Award for Outstanding Individual Contribution:
Edward Lachman, director of photography for Far from Heaven
Volpi Cup:
Best Actor: Stefano Accorsi Un viaggio chiamato amore
Best Actress: Julianne Moore Far from Heaven
Special Mention Best Short Film: Per Carleson Tempo
Marcello Mastroianni Award:
Oasis (Moon So-ri)
Luigi De Laurentiis Award:
Due amici (Francesco Sframeli and Spiro Scimone)
Roger Dodger (Dylan Kidd)
San Marco Prize:
Tian Zhuangzhuang Springtime in a Small Town
Special Jury Award: Shinya Tsukamoto A Snake of June
Special Mention: Arturo Ripstein La virgen de la lujuria
Special Mention: Fruit Chan Public Toilet
Career Golden Lion:
Dino Risi
Audience Award:
Best Film: Patrice Leconte L'Homme du train
Best Actor: Jean Rochefort L'Homme du train
Best Actress: Julianne Moore Far from Heaven
Silver Lion for Best Short Film
Clown (Irina Efteeva)
Prix UIP Venice (European Short Film):
Zsofia Péterffy Kalózok szeretöje
FIPRESCI Prize:
Competition: Oasis (Lee Chang-dong)
Parallel Sections: Roger Dodger (Dylan Kidd)
Best Short Film: 11'09"01 September 11 (Ken Loach)
SIGNIS Award:
Oasis (Lee Chang-dong)
Honorable Mention: Far from Heaven (Todd Haynes)
Honorable Mention: The Tracker (Rolf de Heer)
Don Quixote Award:
Roger Dodger (Dylan Kidd)
UNICEF Award:
Dom durakov (Andrei Konchalovsky)
UNESCO Award:
11'09"01 September 11 (Samira Makhmalbaf, Claude Lelouch, Youssef Chahine, Danis Tanović, Idrissa Ouedraogo, Ken Loach, Alejandro González Iñárritu, Amos Gitaï, Mira Nair, Sean Penn and Shōhei Imamura)
Pasinetti Award:
Best Film: Velocità massima (Daniele Vicari)
Special Mention: Velocità massima (Valerio Mastandrea)
Pietro Bianchi Award:
Sophia Loren
Isvema Award:
Due amici (Francesco Sframeli and Spiro Scimone)
FEDIC Award:
Velocità massima (Daniele Vicari)
Little Golden Lion:
Behind the Sun (Walter Salles and Arthur Cohn)
Wella Prize:
L'anima gemella (Violante Placido and Valentina Cervi)
Future Film Festival Digital Award:
Blood Work (Clint Eastwood)
Special Mention: My Name Is Tanino (Paolo Virzì)
Laterna Magica Prize:
Nha Fala (Flora Gomes)
Sergio Trasatti Award:
Dirty Pretty Things (Stephen Frears)
Rota Soundtrack Award:
The Dancer Upstairs (Alberto Iglesias)
Mimmo Rotella Foundation Award:
Frida (Julie Taymor)
Kinematrix Film Award:
Feature Films: Goldfish Game (Jan Lauwers)
Other Formats: A Snake of June (Shinya Tsukamoto)
Special Director's Award:
Oasis (Lee Chang-dong)

References

External links 

Venice Film Festival 2002 Awards on IMDb

Venice
Venice
Ven
Venice Film Festival
Film
August 2002 events in Europe
September 2002 events in Europe